Great Shefford (or West Shefford) is an English village and civil parish on the River Lambourn in the West Berkshire district of Berkshire. The present civil parish includes the historical parish of Little or East Shefford, a small, reduced community downstream.

Toponymy
The toponym of the Sheffords derives from the Old English for sheep ford.

Amenities
Great Shefford village has a primary school that belongs to Chaddleworth St. Andrew's and Shefford Church of England Federated Primary Schools. It also has a pub-restaurant, The Great Shefford, a shop and a petrol station.

Churches

St Mary

The Church of England parish church of St Mary is one of two existing round-tower churches in Berkshire. The other is St Gregory's parish church at nearby Welford. Unlike the three round-towered churches in Sussex, where the towers are plain flint cylinders with few openings, the Great Shefford one consists of sections with ample fenestration, more like the East Anglian type. The base of the tower, at least, seems to date from the 13th century. It joins the west wall of the nave in a way that suggests it was built at the same time as the nave, which shows early Gothic features. St Mary's belongs to the West Downland benefice group of eight neighbouring churches. Services are held at St Mary's on the first, second and third Sunday of the month. A group service is held at St Stephen's on the fourth Sunday of the month. St Mary's is a Grade II* listed building.

St Stephen
The church of Saint Stephen at Shefford Woodlands is a former Methodist chapel, taken over as part of Saint Mary Church of England parish church in 1911. The church is a Grade II listed building.

St Thomas
St Thomas' Church, East Shefford is a redundant church, but listed as a Grade I historic building. It contains monuments to the widespread Fettiplace family.

Notable people

Richard Brydges (1500–1558), politician, owned and lived at Great Shefford Manor.
Clive Bell (1881–1964), art critic, was born in East Shefford.
Harold Balfour, 1st Baron Balfour of Inchrye (1897–1988), Conservative MP and Privy Councillor, died in Great Shefford.
Brian Cheesman (born 1929), international cricketer, was born in Shefford Woodlands.

Transport
Reading Buses route 4 (Newbury–Lambourn) serves Great Shefford. From 1898 until 1960 the parish included Great Shefford railway station on the Lambourn Valley Railway. The nearest station today is Newbury, 10.5 miles/16 km away. The north-south A338 between Wantage and Hungerford runs through the village and connects to Junction 14 on the M4 motorway.

Demography
The 2011 Census recorded a parish population of 937, and 880 are listed on the Millennium Stone opposite the petrol station. The population had grown by about 5 per cent since the 2011 census.

References

Sources

External links

Great Shefford and Shefford Woodlands
St Mary's and St Stephen's Churches Website

Villages in Berkshire
West Berkshire District
Civil parishes in Berkshire